Goltry is a town in Alfalfa County, Oklahoma, United States. The population was 249 at the 2010 census. Goltry shares the Timberlake school district with the nearby towns of Helena, Jet, and Nash.

Geography
Situated in far southeastern Alfalfa County, Goltry lies along State Highway 45.  Goltry lies midway between the county seat of Cherokee, and the nearest city, Enid, via the aforementioned State Highway 45.

History
Part of the Cherokee Outlet, the area was not open to non-Indian settlement until September 1893. After the opening, a settlement called Karoma emerged on the John Streich farm, approximately one and one-half miles southeast of present Goltry. The Arkansas Valley and Western Railway (later part of the St. Louis and San Francisco Railway, or Frisco, system) constructed a line in 1904 from east to west apart Woods County that after 1907 was Alfalfa County. Karoma's townspeople moved most of their homes and businesses to the railroad. In 1904 a townsite company headed by John Linden surveyed and platted the town on 240 acres. The new community was incorporated and named for Enid resident Charles Goltry, who owned the land and whose milling company constructed a grain elevator there.  Many of the early settlers were Germans from Russia, in addition to a number from the then German state of Bohemia and from Switzerland.  At one time, Goltry was home to two German Mennonite churches.  The remaining Mennonite church, the Pleasant View Church of God in Christ Mennonite, was organized in 1905, by settlers who began to arrive in 1900.  As late as 2000, one-third of the town's residents claimed German ancestry. Birthplace of Wally Parks in 1913, the founder of the National Hot Rod Association.

Demographics

As of the census of 2000, there were 268 people, 120 households, and 72 families residing in the town. There were 146 housing units at an average density of 398.7 per square mile (152.4/km2). The racial makeup of the town was 92.54% White, 4.10% Native American, and 3.36% from two or more races.

There were 120 households, out of which 25.8% had children under the age of 18 living with them, 52.5% were married couples living together, 6.7% had a female householder with no husband present, and 39.2% were non-families. 36.7% of all households were made up of individuals, and 20.8% had someone living alone who was 65 years of age or older. The average household size was 2.23 and the average family size was 2.95.

In the town, the population was spread out, with 25.0% under the age of 18, 3.0% from 18 to 24, 26.1% from 25 to 44, 21.6% from 45 to 64, and 24.3% who were 65 years of age or older. The median age was 42 years. For every 100 females, there were 90.1 males. For every 100 females age 18 and over, there were 82.7 males.

The median income for a household in the town was $30,000, and the median income for a family was $31,979. Males had a median income of $27,500 versus $16,696 for females. The per capita income for the town was $12,182. About 13.8% of families and 18.1% of the population were below the poverty line, including 23.3% of those under the age of 18 and 14.5% of those 65 or over.

References

External links
 Encyclopedia of Oklahoma History and Culture - Goltry

Towns in Alfalfa County, Oklahoma
Towns in Oklahoma